Frank J. Warnke (May 18, 1933 September 23, 2011) was an American politician of who served in both chambers of the Washington State Legislature.

Early life and education 
A Native American, Warnke was born in Harlem, Montana and raised in Auburn, Washington. After graduating from Auburn High School, studied political science at Central Washington University and the University of Washington. He later served in the United States Coast Guard and was stationed in Ketchikan, Alaska.

Career 
After leaving the United States Coast Guard, Warnke worked for Boeing for 10 years. He was elected to the Washington House of Representatives in 1964.

Warnke served 12 years in the Washington House of Representatives for Washington's 30th legislative district and eight years in the Washington State Senate for Washington's 31st legislative district.

Warnke helped create the Public School Employees of Washington (PSE), a union for school district employees, and served 17 years as the organization's executive director. Warnke also drafted legislation to create the Auburn Game Farm Park in Auburn, Washington.

Personal life 
Warnke and his wife, Beverly, had two children. He died in Auburn, Washington in 2011.

References

1933 births
2011 deaths
20th-century American politicians
Democratic Party Washington (state) state senators
Democratic Party members of the Washington House of Representatives
Native American state legislators in Washington (state)
People from Blaine County, Montana
People from Auburn, Washington